Ratta Nauabad  is a village in Kapurthala district of Punjab State, India. The village is administrated by a Sarpanch who is an elected representative of village as per the constitution of India and Panchayati raj (India).

Demography 
According to the report published by Census India in 2011, Ratta Nauabad has 60 houses with the total population of 328 persons of which 164 are male and 164 females. Literacy rate of Ratta Nauabad is 76.17%, higher than the state average of 75.84%.  The population of children in the age group 0–6 years is 51 which is 15.55% of the total population. Child sex ratio is approximately 962, higher than the state average of 846.

Population data

References

External links
  Villages in Kapurthala
 Kapurthala Villages List

Villages in Kapurthala district